Nicaragua competed at the 2016 Summer Olympics in Rio de Janeiro, Brazil, from 5 to 21 August 2016. This was the nation's thirteenth appearance at the Summer Olympics, with the exception of the 1988 Summer Olympics in Seoul because of its partial support to the North Korean boycott.

Nicaragua Olympic Committee sent the nation's smallest delegation to the Games since 2004. A total of five athletes, three men and two women, were selected to the Nicaraguan team across four different sports. Majority of Nicaraguan athletes made their Olympic debut in Rio de Janeiro, except for butterfly swimmer Dalia Torrez Zamora, who attended her third Games as the oldest (aged 26) and most experienced competitor. Meanwhile, air pistol shooter Rafael Lacayo, the youngest of the team (aged 17), led the delegation as the nation's flag bearer in the opening ceremony. Nicaragua, however, has yet to win its first ever Olympic medal.

Athletics
 
Nicaraguan athletes have so far achieved qualifying standards in the following athletics events (up to a maximum of 3 athletes in each event):

Track & road events

Shooting
 
Nicaragua has received an invitation from the Tripartite Commission to send a men's pistol shooter to the Olympics.

Qualification Legend: Q = Qualify for the next round; q = Qualify for the bronze medal (shotgun)

Swimming

Nicaragua has received a Universality invitation from FINA to send two swimmers (one male and one female) to the Olympics.

Weightlifting

Nicaragua has received an invitation from the Tripartite Commission to send Scarleth Mercado in the women's featherweight category (53 kg) to the Olympics.

See also
Nicaragua at the 2015 Pan American Games

References

External links 
 

Nations at the 2016 Summer Olympics
2016
2016 in Nicaraguan sport